Evlogi Georgiev (3 October 1819 – 5 July 1897) was a major Bulgarian merchant, banker and benefactor. The main building of the Sofia University was built with a large financial donation by him and his brother Hristo Georgiev.

Biography
Georgiev was born in Karlovo, but spent most of his life in Bucharest, where he operated a successful business.

Honour
Evlogi Peak on Smith Island, South Shetland Islands is named after Evlogi Georgiev.

External links 

 

1819 births
1897 deaths
Burials at Bellu Cemetery
People from Karlovo
19th-century Bulgarian people
19th-century Bulgarian businesspeople
Bulgarian bankers
Bulgarian philanthropists
Bulgarian expatriates in Romania
19th-century philanthropists